The Egborg Girl is a 1969 Danish comedy film directed by Carl Ottosen and starring Dirch Passer.

Cast
 Dirch Passer - Skibskok John Søgaard
 Willy Rathnov - Student John Søgaard
 Karl Stegger - Godsbestyrer Koch
 Sisse Reingaard - Marianne Koch
 Birgit Sadolin - Kokkepigen Rikke
 Ove Sprogøe - Advokat Kurt Mikkelsen
 Morten Grunwald - Fuldmægtig hos Mikkelsen
 Tine Blichmann - Stuepigen Tine
 Arne Møller - Arne
 Bent Vejlby - Bjarne
 Hans-Henrik Krause - Professoren
 Inger Gleerup - Servitrice
 William Kisum - Telegrafbudet
 Gertie Jung - Pigen fra ismejeriet
 Claus Ryskjær - Cylkelbudet Kaj
 Frederik Frederiksen - Entertainer
 Svend Asmussen - Entertainer

External links

1969 films
1960s Danish-language films
1969 comedy films
Films directed by Carl Ottosen
Films scored by Sven Gyldmark
Danish comedy films